The 1955 UCI Road World Championships took place in Frascati, Italy.

Events Summary

References

 
UCI Road World Championships by year
W
1955 in Italian sport
International cycle races hosted by Italy